Bogger may refer to:

 LHD (load, haul, dump machine), an articulated mining vehicle
 A vehicle used in mud bogging, an off-road sport